The American Anglican Church (AAC) is a Continuing Anglican jurisdiction which was founded later in the history of the Continuing Anglican movement, ultimately deriving from controversies in the Episcopal Church. These were over the ordination of women to the priesthood, liberal or progressive theology, and a new revision of the Book of Common Prayer (adopted in 1979). Holy Innocents Anglican Church in New York serves as the AAC headquarters.

History

Beliefs 
The American Anglican Church is a product of the Continuing Anglican movement, as such its doctrines are generally within the orthodoxy of that movement. It summarizes its doctrine, discipline, and worship in a mission statement:We Believe The Holy Scriptures of the Old and New Testaments to be the Word of God; The Creeds (as the standard of faith) mean exactly what they say; Christian morality of the New Testament is the sole guide of faith and practice. The denomination conforms to most of the standards contained in the Affirmation of St. Louis. and counts at present thirteen parishes and missions in North America, many of which serve the Kenyan diaspora population.

Seminary 
The American Anglican Church has one theological seminary. St. Andrew's Institute of Theology is an unaccredited seminary. 

Despite claiming not to be a correspondence school, there is no physical seminary facility, course work and teaching feedback are often submitted via mail or electronic correspondence. While courses are open to anyone, the Institute is primarily focused on training internal candidates for ordination.

References

External links
 

Continuing Anglican movement
Christian denominations